The Palace of Villahermosa (Spanish: Palacio de Villahermosa) is a ducal palace located in Madrid, Spain. It was built in the 18th century and remodelled in 1805 in the neoclassical style.

The former townhouse of the Dukes of Villahermosa, it was designated to be of Bien de Interés Cultural in 1993, and now houses the Thyssen-Bornemisza Museum.

See also 
 Art museum
 Duke of Villahermosa

References 

Palaces in Madrid
Bien de Interés Cultural landmarks in Madrid
Neoclassical architecture in Madrid
Paseo del Prado
Buildings and structures in Cortes neighborhood, Madrid